Flakkebjerg is a village on Zealand, Denmark. It is located in Slagelse Municipality.

Flakkebjerg School Museum
Flakkebjerg School Museum (Danish: Flakkebjerg Skolemuseum) is a museum located in Flakkebjerg. The museum focuses on schools in the period 1904–1962, and has existed since 1981. It is located in a former school, known as Flakkebjerg Lower Ground School (Danish: Flakkebjerg Forskole).

Gallery

References

Cities and towns in Region Zealand
Slagelse Municipality
Villages in Denmark